Notable people with the name Edison include:


Surname 
 Brent Edison (born 1956), American attorney and politician
 Charles Edison (1890–1969), son of Thomas Edison, and Governor of New Jersey
 Dominique Edison (born 1986), American football wide receiver
 Harry Edison (1915–1999), American jazz trumpeter
 Laurie Toby Edison (born 1942), American photographer
 Matthew Edison (born 1975), Canadian actor
 Mike Edison (born 1964), American writer
 Noel Edison (born 1958), Canadian conductor
 Theodore Miller Edison (1898–1992), American inventor, fourth son of Thomas Edison
 Thomas Edison (1847–1931), American inventor
 Tommy Edison (born 1963), blind YouTuber

Given name 
 Edison Barrios (born 1988), Venezuelan professional baseball player
 Edison Carter, a character in Max Headroom
 Edison Chen (born 1980), Hong Kong teen idol
 Edison Denisov (1929–1996), Russian composer
 Edison James (born 1943), former prime minister of Dominica
 Édison Méndez (born 1979), Ecuadoran football midfielder
 Edison Reynoso (born 1975), Dominican baseball player

English masculine given names